Michelle Vizzuso (born April 13, 1977 in Fairfield Township, Essex County, New Jersey) is an American former field hockey player who made her international senior debut for the Women's National Team in 1997. Playing as a forward, Vizzuso  was a member of the team, that won the silver medal at the 1999 Pan American Games in Winnipeg.

Vizzuso grew up in Fairfield, and attended West Essex High School. She graduated from the University of Virginia in 1999, having majored in English. She currently resides in Marvin, NC.

International Senior Tournaments
 1998 – World Cup, Utrecht, The Netherlands (8th) 
 1999 – Pan American Games, Winnipeg, Canada (2nd) 
 2000 – Olympic Qualifying Tournament, Milton Keynes, England (6th)

References

1977 births
Living people
American female field hockey players
People from Fairfield Township, Essex County, New Jersey
University of Virginia alumni
West Essex High School alumni
Field hockey players at the 1999 Pan American Games
Pan American Games silver medalists for the United States
Medalists at the 1999 Pan American Games
Pan American Games medalists in field hockey
21st-century American women